The Hammer-Sommer was an automobile built in Detroit, Michigan by the Hammer-Sommer Auto Carriage Company Ltd. from 1902 to 1904.  The Hammer-Sommer came only as a five-seater, detachable tonneau model.  The vehicle came equipped with a 12 hp opposed two-cylinder engine, mounted beneath the body, and had a planetary transmission.  The company claimed the vehicle would reach .  The company was eventually split separately into the Hammer and Sommers companies.

References
 

Defunct motor vehicle manufacturers of the United States
Motor vehicle manufacturers based in Michigan
Cars powered by boxer engines
Defunct companies based in Michigan